The Iranian Volleyball Super League 2014–15 was the 28th season of the Iranian Volleyball Super League, the highest professional volleyball league in Iran.

Regular season

Pool A

Pool B

Playoffs
All times are Iran Standard Time (UTC+03:30).
All series were the best-of-three format, except for the single-match 3rd place playoff and final.

Quarterfinals
Paykan Tehran vs. Vezarat Defa Tehran

Matin Varamin vs. Shahrdari Tabriz

Shahrdari Urmia vs. Javaheri Gonbad

Mizan Khorasan vs. Novin Keshavarz Tehran

Semifinals
Paykan Tehran vs. Shahrdari Tabriz

Shahrdari Urmia vs. Mizan Khorasan

3rd place
Venue: Azadi Volleyball Hall, Tehran

Shahrdari Tabriz vs. Mizan Khorasan

Final
Venue: Azadi Volleyball Hall, Tehran

Paykan Tehran vs. Shahrdari Urmia

Final standings

References

External links
Iran Volleyball Federation
Final Standing
Regular Season Pool A Standing
Regular Season Pool B Standing

League 2014-15
Iran Super League, 2014-15
Iran Super League, 2014-15
Volleyball League, 2014-15
Volleyball League, 2014-15